Zulkifli bin Ibrahim is a Malaysian politician from BERSATU. He was the Member of Penang State Legislative Assembly for Sungai Acheh since 2018 until 2023.

Education 
He has studied in Methodist Nibong Tebal Primary and Secondary School, and in Nibong Tebal Technical School. He got his Diploma in Marine Technology Engineering from UTM.

Politics 
Zulkifli started his political career as the Political Secretary for the by-then Nibong Tebal MP, Goh Kheng Huat in 1999. He is also one of the hosts during the launch of PKR in Renaissance Kuala Lumpur Hotel on 4 April 1999. He is also one of the co-founders of Keadilan Penang together with Zaki and Mansor Othman.

In 2000, he was appointed as the Spokesperson of the Youth Wing of Keadilan Penang. He was also a Member of Keadilan Youth Wing Committee. 

He is also one of the Youth leader that wanted Saifuddin Nasution Ismail to be chosen as the Deputy Chief of the Youth Wing of Keadilan instead of Mustaffa Kamil Ayub, who was seen to be too weak when several Youth leaders of Keadilan had been arrested under the ISA.

On 29 June 2020, PKR Chairman of Disciplinary Committee, Datuk Ahmad Kassim had announced that Zulkifli is expelled from PKR as he supported the Perikatan Nasional government openly and held posts from the government. On 5 July 2020, he had announced that he will join BERSATU in the near future.

Election result

Family 
He was born at Nibong Tebal, Pulau Pinang on 30 November 1979 in Sungai Bakap Hospital. He is the youngest of 8 children of Haji Ibrahim bin Abd Razak and Hajah Sopiah binti Omar.

Reference 

People from Penang
University of Technology Malaysia alumni
Malaysian United Indigenous Party politicians
Former People's Justice Party (Malaysia) politicians
Members of the Penang State Legislative Assembly
Malaysian people of Malay descent
Living people
1979 births